Dehaj (also romanized as Dahaj; also known as Dehīj) is a city and capital of Dehaj District, in Shahr-e Babak County, Kerman Province, Iran.  At the 2006 census, its population was 7,756, in 1,600 families.

Ayyoub's (Job's) Cave is located near Dehaj.

References

Populated places in Shahr-e Babak County

Cities in Kerman Province